Qasemabad (also Romanized as Qāsemābād; also known as Ghasem Abad Hamzehloo) is a village in Salehan Rural District, in the Central District of Khomeyn County, Markazi Province, Iran. At the 2006 census, its population was 122, in 37 families.

References 

Populated places in Khomeyn County